Emil Göing (31 January 1912 – 14 June 1994) was a German basketball player. He competed in the men's tournament at the 1936 Summer Olympics.

References

1912 births
1994 deaths
German men's basketball players
Olympic basketball players of Germany
Basketball players at the 1936 Summer Olympics
Sportspeople from Hanover